103rd Street–Beverly Hills is one of five Metra stations within the Beverly Hills neighborhood of Chicago, Illinois, along the Beverly Branch of the Rock Island District Line. The station is located at 10301 South Walden Parkway on the corner of 103rd Street,  from LaSalle Street Station, the northern terminus of the line. In Metra's zone-based fare system, 103rd Street is in zone C. As of 2018, 103rd Street–Beverly Hills is the 71st busiest of Metra's 236 non-downtown stations, with an average of 734 weekday boardings.

As of 2022, 103rd Street–Beverly Hills is served by 20 trains in each direction on weekdays, by 10 inbound trains and 11 outbound trains on Saturdays, and by eight trains in each direction on Sundays.

Parking is available along both side of the tracks between 101st Street and 105th Street. South Walden Parkway runs along the west side of the tracks and contains parking lots between the street and the tracks. Hale Avenue runs along the east side of the tracks and also contains parking lots between the street and tracks. Hale Avenue terminates at 103rd Street, but a parking lot runs further north from there to 101st Street.

Bus connections
CTA
  103 West 103rd

References

External links

Dusk image of 103rd Street Station (Metra Railfan Photos)
Station from 103rd Street from Google Maps Street View

Metra stations in Chicago
Former Chicago, Rock Island and Pacific Railroad stations
Railway stations in the United States opened in 1892